Gajan or Shivagajan is a Hindu festival celebrated mostly in the Indian state of West Bengal. It is associated with such deities as Shiva, Neel and Dharmaraj. Gajan spans around a week, starting at the last week of Choitro continuing till the end of the Bengali year. It ends with Charak Puja. Participants of this festival is known as sannyasi or Bhokto. Persons of any gender can be a participant. The complete history of the festival is not known. The central theme of this festival is deriving satisfaction through non-sexual pain, devotion and sacrifice.

Etymology
The word gajan in Bengali comes from the word garjan or roar that sannyasis (hermits) emit during the festivities. Alternatively, the word gajan is considered a combination of parts of two words - ga is from the word gram meaning village and jan is from the word janasadharan meaning folk. In this sense gajan is a festival of village folk.

Significance
In Shiva’s gajan Shiva is married to Harakali on this day. The sannyasis form the barjatri (bridegroom’s party). In Dharma’s gajan Dharmathakur is married to Kamini-Kamakhya in Bankura Dist.or Mukti. The most recent studies on the gajan festival are: 1) Nicholas, R. Rites of Spring. Gājan in Village Bengal. New Delhi: Chronicle Books, 2008; and 2) Ferrari, F.M. Guilty Males and Proud Females. Negotiating Genders in a Bengali Festival. Calcutta and London: Seagull, 2010.

Fairs

Fairs are often associated with the celebration of gajan.

References

Further reading 
 
 
 
 

Festivals in West Bengal
Hindu festivals
Religious festivals in India
Bengali Hindu festivals